The Department of Families, Fairness and Housing (DFFH) is a department of the Government of Victoria. Formed from the splitting of Department of Health and Human Services in the ongoing response to the COVID-19 pandemic, DFFH holds responsibility for child protection, housing and disability. It also incorporates functions formerly performed by the Department of Premier and Cabinet. These functions included veterans affairs, women and youth, multicultural affairs and LGBTQI+ equality. 

DFFH commenced operations on 1 February 2021 with Sandy Pitcher as Secretary of the Department and Richard Wynne as the coordinating minister at the time.

Ministers 
, the DFFH supports six ministers in the following portfolio areas:

References 

Government departments of Victoria (Australia)
Ministries established in 2021
2021 establishments in Australia
Victoria